"Me Pasé" (translit I passed ) is a song by Spanish singer Enrique Iglesias, featuring Puerto Rican singer-songwriter Farruko. It was released by Sony Music Latin on 1 July 2021, as a single from Iglesias' eleventh studio album Final (Vol. 1).

Music video 
The video was released 1 July 2021. It was filmed in Samana El Portillo, Dominican Republic and directed by Alejandro Pérez. Within the first 18 hours of its release, it was streamed more than a million times. As of December 2021, it has been viewed over 39 million times.

Track listing

Charts

Weekly charts

Year-end charts

Certifications

See also
List of Billboard Hot Latin Songs and Latin Airplay number ones of 2021

References 

Enrique Iglesias songs
2021 songs
2021 singles
Farruko songs